The Wait is a 2021 Nigerian faith-based drama film directed by Yemi Morafa and Fiyin Gambo, and produced by Tolu LordTanner  The film stars Nse Ikpe Etim, Deyemi Okanlawon, Jimmy Odukoya, Ini Dima-Okojie, Meg Otanwa, Chimezie Imo and Aisha Sanni-Shittu in the lead roles. The film is based on God's Waiting Room, a faith-based book written by prominent Nigerian lawyer Yewande Zaccheaus. The film had its theatrical release on 30 April 2021 and received mixed reviews from critics.

Cast 

 Nse Ikpe Etim
 Ini Dima-Okojie
 Deyemi Okanlawon
 Jimmy Odukoya
 Chimezie Imo
 Joke Silva
 Kate Henshaw
 Meg Otanwa
 Uche Chika Elumelu
 Aisha Sanni-Shittu
 Juliana Olayode
 Mike Afolarin
 Demi Banwo
 Anie Icha

References 

English-language Nigerian films
Nigerian drama films
2021 drama films
2020s English-language films